Beneath the Rhythm and Sound is an album by the American alternative rock band the Ocean Blue, released in 1993.

The first single, "Sublime", peaked at No. 3 on Billboards Modern Rock Tracks chart. The band supported the album by touring with Suddenly, Tammy!

Production
The album was recorded in Nassau, Bahamas. The lyrics were written by lead singer David Schelzel, who wanted to return to the song-based writing of the first album, instead of concentrating mostly on the production.

Critical reception

Trouser Press thought that "the self-produced Beneath the Rhythm and Sound lacks the outside opinion it clearly needed; a more seasoned set of hands could've brought 'Sublime' (which pleads for multi-tracked backing vocals) and 'Either/Or' ... to much fuller fruition." The Washington Post determined that "this Anglophile Pennsylvania quartet cultivates a generalized mid-'80s British guitar-band sound on upbeat tunes like 'Peace of Mind' and 'Sublime', but when the pace slips toward the sauntering the debt to Morrissey and Marr becomes formidable." The Columbus Dispatch called Beneath the Rhythm and Sound "a lush, jangly, alluring collection of rock songs."

The St. Petersburg Times praised "Dave Lau's light sax on 'Bliss is Unaware'." The Philadelphia Inquirer opined that "you'd be hard-pressed to find a record more bland and blanched than the third release from the Ocean Blue ... Choosing to set sail on a listless sea of English pop styles, David Schelzel affects the adenoidal mannerisms of New Order's Bernard Sumner, Haircut 100's Nick Heyward, and a host of Postard-label Scottish acts." The Chicago Tribune stated that the band "rings in a subtle alternative rock sound with swirling keyboards." The Record commended "the guitar and keyboard interplay that adds tension to 'Don't Believe Everything You Hear'."

AllMusic wrote: "Leaving behind the mellow minimalism of their first two records, the Pennsylvanians gave their ethereal music a brighter, glossier sheen on this record."

Track listing

PersonnelThe Ocean Blue David Schelzel – vocals, guitar
 Rob Minnig – drums, keyboards, backing vocals
 Bobby Mittan – bass guitar
 Steve Lau – keyboards, saxophone, backing vocalsTechnical'
 The Ocean Blue – producers (track 6), co-producers (tracks 1–5, 7–11)
 Kevin Moloney – co-producer (tracks 1–5, 7–11)
 Rob Minnig – engineer (track 6), mixing (tracks 6, 10–11)
 Michael Brauer – mixing (tracks 1–2, 8)
 Jay Healy – mixing (tracks 3–4, 8–9)
 Neil Davenport – photography
 Kim Champagne – art direction
 Scott Hull – mastering

References

1993 albums
Sire Records albums